Los Pollos is a town in the Coclé province of Panama.

Sources 
World Gazetteer: Panama – World-Gazetteer.com

Populated places in Coclé Province